Strindheim Church (historically: Bromstad kirke) is a parish church of the Church of Norway in Trondheim municipality in Trøndelag county, Norway. It is located in the Strindheim area in the city of Trondheim. It is the church for the Strindheim parish which is part of the Strinda prosti (deanery) in the Diocese of Nidaros. The modern, red, brick church was built in a rectangular style in 1979 using plans drawn up by the architect Elisabeth Fidjestøl. The church seats about 240 people.

History
The new parish of Strindheim was established in 1961 when it was separated from the Strinda Church parish. The congregation used temporary facilities until 1979 when they completed their own church. The building was consecrated on 1 April 1979. The red brick building contains a sanctuary plus other offices and meeting rooms.

See also
List of churches in Nidaros

References

Churches in Trondheim
Churches in Trøndelag
Rectangular churches in Norway
Brick churches in Norway
20th-century Church of Norway church buildings
Churches completed in 1979
1979 establishments in Norway